Agnès Teppe (born 4 May 1968 in Bourg-en-Bresse) is a former French athlete, who specialised in the discus throw.

She won two French national championship titles in the discus: in 1990 and 1994.

Bronze medalist at the 1991 Mediterranean Games, in Athens, she won the 1989 Games of La Francophonie and obtained the silver medal in those games in 2005.

She is the older sister of Nathalie Teppe, a specialist in the heptathlon.

National titles

 French Championships in Athletics :
 2 times winner of the Discus Throw: 1990 and 1994

Personal records

References

 Docathlé2003, French Athletics Federation, 2003 p. 433

1968 births
Living people
Sportspeople from Bourg-en-Bresse
French female discus throwers
Mediterranean Games bronze medalists for France
Athletes (track and field) at the 1991 Mediterranean Games
Mediterranean Games medalists in athletics